Stivanello is an Italian surname. Notable people with the surname include:

Giorgio Stivanello (1932–2010), Italian footballer
Piero Stivanello (born 1957), Italian footballer and manager, son of Giorgio
Riccardo Stivanello (born 2004), Italian footballer

Italian-language surnames